The 2015 Senior League World Series took place from August 2–8 in Bangor, Maine, United States. Houston, Texas defeated Holmes County, Ohio in the championship game. It was the second straight title for Houston's West University Little League.

A modified double-elimination format was introduced this year.

Teams

Results

Group A

Group B 

Consolation round

Elimination Round

References

Senior League World Series
Senior League World Series
Senior League
Sports competitions in Maine